The Germany national korfball team is managed by the Deutscher Turner Bund e.V (DTB), representing Germany in korfball international competitions.


Tournament history

Current squad

References

External links
  Deutscher Turner Bund e.V (DTB)

National korfball teams
Korfball
Korfball in Germany